Coree J. W. Te Whata-Colley (born 13 January 1995) is a New Zealand rugby union player who plays for  in the Bunnings NPC. His position is prop.

Reference list

External links
itsrugby.co.uk profile

1995 births
New Zealand rugby union players
Living people
Rugby union props
Counties Manukau rugby union players
Northland rugby union players
People educated at Wesley College, Auckland